The province of North Sulawesi (Sulawesi Utara) in Indonesia is divided into eleven regencies (kabupaten) and four cities (kota), which together are subdivided in turn administratively into 171 districts (kecamatan).

The districts of North Sulawesi with the regency or city each falls into, are as follows:

 Manado (city)

 Bunaken
 Bunaken Kepulauan
 Malalayang
 Mapanget
 Paal Dua
 Sario
 Singkil
 Tikala
 Tuminting
 Wanea
 Wenang

 Bitung (city)
 Aertembaga
 Girian
 Lembeh Selatan
 Lembeh Utara
 Madidir
 Maesa
 Matuari
 Ranowulu

 Tomohon (city)
 Tomohon Barat
 Tomohon Selatan
 Tomohon Tengah
 Tomohon Timur
 Tomohon Utara

 Minahasa Regency
 Eris
 Kakas
 Kakas Barat
 Kawangkoan
 Kawangkoan Barat
 Kawangkoan Utara
 Kombi
 Langowan Barat
 Langowan Selatan
 Langowan Timur
 Langowan Utara
 Lembean Timur
 Mandolang
 Pineleng
 Remboken
 Sonder
 Tombariri
 Tombariri Timur
 Tombulu
 Tompaso
 Tompaso Barat
 Tondano Barat
 Tondano Selatan
 Tondano Timur
 Tondano Utara

 South Minahasa Regency
 Amurang
 Amurang Barat
 Amurang Timur
 Kumelembuai
 Maesaan
 Modoinding
 Motoling
 Motoling Barat
 Motoling Timur
 Ranoyapo
 Sinonsayang
 Suluun Tareran
 Tareran
 Tatapaan
 Tenga
 Tompasobaru
 Tumpaan

 North Minahasa Regency
 Airmadidi
 Dimembe
 Kalawat
 Kauditan
 Kema
 Likupang Barat
 Likupang Selatan
 Likupang Timur
 Talawaan
 Wori

 Southeast Minahasa Regency
 Belang
 Pasan
 Pusomaen
 Ratahan
 Ratahan Timur
 Ratatotok
 Silian Raya
 Tombatu
 Tombatu Timur
 Tombatu Utara
 Touluaan
 Touluaan Selatan

 Kotamobagu (city)
 Kotamobagu Barat
 Kotamobagu Selatan
 Kotamobagu Timur
 Kotamobagu Utara

 Bolaang Mongondow Regency
 Bilalang
 Bolaang
 Bolaang Timur
 Dumoga
 Dumoga Barat
 Dumoga Tengah
 Dumoga Tenggara
 Dumoga Timur
 Dumoga Utara
 Lolak
 Lolayan
 Passi Barat
 Passi Timur
 Poigar
 Sangtombolang

 North Bolaang Mongondow Regency
 Bintauna
 Bolangitang Barat
 Bolangitang Timur
 Kaidipang
 Pinogaluman
 Sangkub

 South Bolaang Mongondow Regency
 Bolaang Uki
 Helumo
 Pinolosian
 Pinolosian Tengah
 Pinolosian Timur
 Posigadan
 Tomini
Modisi

 East Bolaang Mongondow Regency
 Kotabunan
 Modayag
 Modayag Barat
 Mooat
 Motongkad
 Nuangan
 Tutuyan

 Talaud Islands Regency
 Beo
 Beo Selatan
 Beo Utara
 Damau
 Essang
 Essang Selatan
 Gemeh
 Kabaruan
 Kalongan
 Lirung
 Melonguane
 Melonguane Timur
 Miangas
 Moronge
 Nanusa
 Pulutan
 Rainis
 Salibabu
 Tampan’amma

 Sangihe Islands Regency
 Kendahe
 Kepulauan Marore
 Manganitu
 Manganitu Selatan
 Nusa Tabukan
 Tabukan Selatan
 Tabukan Selatan Tengah
 Tabukan Selatan Tenggara
 Tabukan Tengah
 Tabukan Utara
 Tahuna
 Tahuna Barat
 Tahuna Timur
 Tamako
 Tatoareng

 Sitaro Islands Regency
 Biaro
 Siau Barat   
 Siau Barat Selatan
 Siau Barat Utara       
 Siau Tengah
 Siau Timur
 Siau Timur Selatan
 Tagulandang
 Tagulandang Selatan
 Tagulandang Utara

References

 
North Sulawesi